The Frontier MD-II was an American homebuilt aircraft that was designed and supplied as a kit by Frontier Aircraft Inc of Vail, Colorado, introduced in the 1990s.

Design and development
The MD-II featured a strut-braced high-wing, a two-seats-in-side-by-side configuration enclosed cockpit accessed via doors, fixed conventional landing gear with wheel pants and a single tractor engine.

The aircraft was fabricated from 2024-T3 aluminum sheet.

The manufacturer estimated the construction time from the supplied kit at 1500 hours.

Operational history
By 1998, the company reported two kits had been sold with two aircraft complete and flying.

In December 2013, no examples were registered with the US Federal Aviation Administration.

Specifications (MD-II)

References

MD-II
1990s United States sport aircraft
1990s United States civil utility aircraft
Single-engined tractor aircraft
High-wing aircraft
Homebuilt aircraft